Sound exchange may refer to:

SoX, a free cross-platform digital audio editor, licensed under the GNU General Public License, and distributed by Chris Bagwell through SourceForge.net
SoundExchange, a non-profit collective rights management organization that collects royalties on the behalf of sound recording copyright owners and featured artists for non-interactive digital transmissions including satellite and Internet radio